Jinshi Township is an rural township in Xiangtan County, Hunan Province, People's Republic of China.  it had a population of 29,896 and an area of .

Administrative division
 the township administers 11 villages: Tangjiahu Village, Jinhu Village, Jinshi Village, Wenjia Village, Taiyang Village, Shengli Village, Biquan Village, Qingtang Village, Dongjian Village, Dongbian New Village, and Dahetang Village.

Attractions
Biquan Deep is the scenic spot in the town.

Culture
Huaguxi is the most influential form of local theater.

References

External links

Divisions of Xiangtan County